There are 91 working locks on the Canal du Midi along its  course from the Bassin du Thau on the Mediterranean coast to the junction with the Canal lateral a la Garonne in Toulouse. There are a further 13 locks on the  La Nouvelle branch which runs through Narbonne to the Mediterranean at Port-la-Nouvelle. The locks are all under the management of the French navigation authority, Voies navigables de France.

Construction

The Canal du Midi was built between 1666 and 1681 by Pierre-Paul Riquet to provide an inland water route through Southern France between the Atlantic at Bordeaux and the Mediterranean at Sète via the Garonne. The first design for the locks on the canal was a rectangular shape however due to a collapse of a side-wall early in the building program (exactly which lock is not recorded), Riquet modified his plans and rebuilt both existing and new locks with an ovoid chamber. They were typically 11m wide at the midpoint and 6m at the gates with an overall length of 30.5m. Riquet also restricted the maximum rise to 2.9m so whereas previously he would have built one deep lock he instead used intermediate gates creating double, triple and sometimes quadruple chambers. During the Canal du Midi modernisation program of the 1970s several of these multiple chambers were converted into single "deep" locks with concrete side walls.

The lock gates were originally made of oak in the traditional mitre pattern with balance beams and each gate had a single large wooden sluice drawn up by a vertical screw. The introduction of electric and hydraulic systems for both the lifting of the sluices and the opening of the gates has seen the removal of the balance beams and modern gates are of metal construction.

At each lock there is a double-fronted two-storey lock keeper's house upon which is fixed either a cast iron or a masonry sign showing the name of the lock and the name and distance to the adjacent locks in each direction. The locks are still operated by lock keepers and passage is only possible when they are in attendance however on La Nouvelle branch operation by boaters is allowed. The locks are open every day except 1 January, 11 November and 25 December, from 08:00 until 17:30 out of season and 08:00 until 19:00 in the summer peak; all locks are closed 12:30 – 13:30 for lunch.

Profile
The graph shows the profile of the Canal du Midi from Toulouse (1), through the summit of the canal at Seuil de Naurouze (2), Castelnaudary (3), then Carcassonne (4) and Trèbes (5). The channel continues to Béziers just after Fonsérannes Lock (6), and then on to Agde (7) before flowing in to the Bassin de Thau at Sète (8).

Locks

The following list numbers the  locks from the  Canal lateral a la Garonne in the west to the Bassin du Thau in the east. Staircase locks are listed as a single entity but the number of individual chambers in the flight is noted. Travelling west to east from Toulouse to Sète the locks numbered 1–18 are ascending and 19–86 are descending. Castanet lock is the first lock with an elliptical chamber, as Riquet realised it was the best fit solution due to mechanical stress from surrounding areas.

See also
Aqueducts on the Canal du Midi
Water features on the Canal du Midi

Notes
 Lock numbers are as given in the appendix of the 1994 edition From Sea to Sea by L.T.C. Rolt
 The flight at Fonserannes was "replaced" by a water slope in 1984 hence the single "lock number". However, the slope has never worked and the 6 flight staircase remains the only way to pass through meaning that there are 91 locks but only 86 numbers.
 Chamber has three sets of gates, the third being the junction with the branch descente dans l'Hérault

References